Masking Threshold is a 2021 English-language Austrian horror film directed by Johannes Grenzfurthner, and produced by art group monochrom.

Horror and sound play an essential role in the film. Grenzfurthner says that Masking Threshold forms a trilogy with Razzennest and his upcoming film Solvent.

Plot
A skeptic IT worker tries to cure his harrowing hearing impairment by conducting a series of experiments in his makeshift home lab.

The film combines the style of a chamber play, a scientific procedural and the aesthetic of unboxing or DIY YouTube videos, with body horror elements and techniques known from experimental film. Grenzfurthner sees the film in the tradition of extreme cinema, but presents elements of psychological horror.

In an interview with Thomas Kaestle, Grenzfurthner talks about his motivation.

Masking Threshold is a film about a suffering but stubborn and willful person whose perspective of the world and whose beliefs are turned upside down, whose dogmas are turned against the world and against himself. My protagonist is queer, so you want to understand the societal pressures on him, you want to understand the trauma he's been through and the burden of his terrible illness. But there comes a point when sympathy for him turns to horror. [...] There have been a few excellent attempts to bring Cosmicism to the screen, but most of the time it seems cheap. The wonderful thing about weird fiction is that we can't really imaginethe horror, that the transdimensional evil just isn't the tentacle monster that looks ridiculous as an FX puppet or as a rendered CGI representation. I've never wanted to show what my protagonist is actually talking about and what the danger looks like. But I did want to show what it drives him to do.

Cast
 Ethan Haslam as the protagonist (voice)
 Johannes Grenzfurthner as the protagonist (corporeal)
 Katharina Rose as Dana

All other cast members are but images on the protagonist's cellphone or on photographs and printouts.

Release
Masking Threshold premiered at Fantastic Fest 2021 in Austin, Texas. Programming director Annick Mahnert published her decision:Once in a while as a programmer, you come across a movie that is so special and different from anything you've seen that it sticks with you. Masking Threshold has been haunting me since I saw it, and for a long time I wondered if you, dear Fantastic Fest audience, were ready for it. But isn't it the role of a programmer to take chances and be bold? You may want to burn me at the stake for programming Masking Threshold, but I'll gladly hand you the gasoline and the matches to light the pyre.

Other festivals, including Molins Horror (2021), A Night of Horror (2021), Nightmares (2021), Feratum (2021), South African Horrorfest (2021), Cucalorus, Saskatoon, Slick 'n' Wrong, Shockfest, Film Maudit 2.0, Central Florida, Unnamed Footage in San Francisco, Offscreen in Brussels, Diagonale 2022 in Graz, Panic Fest 2022, and Fantaspoa 2002 screened the film.

Distribution
Drafthouse Films is distributing the film in the United States. It had a limited theatrical release in October 2022, and was released digitally on 7 October 2022.

Reception

Critical response
Critical response has been positive. The film holds a 100% approval rating on the review aggregator website Rotten Tomatoes, with a weighted average of 8.2/10. Jen Yamato of the Los Angeles Times writes: "Utilizing macro photography and ASMR-esque sound design, the immersive, experimental horror Masking Threshold pulls you down a rabbit hole where Reddit theorizing meets Lovecraftian fixation, paranoia bubbling over into a disturbing sensory experience." Erik Piepenburg of The New York Times says: "2022 was a stellar year for experimental horror. I'm adding Johannes Grenzfurthner's brazen and deeply disturbing film to the year's best formbusters." Horror Movies Uncut (5/5) concludes: "Each decade must have one film that truly disturbs even the most avid horror watcher and Masking Threshold may just be that film." Bradley Gibson of Film Threat (9/10) says that "it will test your sanity. [...] Despite, or perhaps because of, the graphic imagery, this feature is a brilliant look at obsession and the possible grisly endpoint of reductio ad absurdum." UK Film Review (5/5) describes it as "a claustrophobic, harrowing horror which is likely to make even the most strong willed viewer squeamish." iHorror says: "Masking Threshold is unlike anything you have seen before. It’s a dose of pure insanity that is constantly brought home by macro focus and audio that pushes you all of the damn place. It is never insanity without a multilayered source. The entirety feels dangerous and a lot like riding in a race car with no seatbelt of framework." Brian Collins of What To Watch (4/5) states: "For me, I can't even think of another moviegoing experience like it. Grenzfurthner deserves some kind of award for how well he fully committed to what seems like a nightmarish set of limitations for a filmmaker and used them to his advantage." Andrew Stover of Film Inquiry summarizes: "The warped, claustrophobic horror of Masking Threshold is wholly original, making it one of the best horror films of the year. Grenzfurthner’s grim, artsy horror film is unforgettable." KPFK's Film Club calls it "brilliantly nightmarish." Film critic Brandon Judell praises the film's screenplay as one of best of recent years: "With the superb cinematography of Florian Hofer, and the awe-inducing editing by both Grenzfurthner and Hofer, Masking Threshold is a wry, dissective look at modern society's derangement."

Awards
 The Film from Hell - Best of the Festival at Nightmares Film Festival 2021 (Columbus, Ohio)
 Best Screenplay at A Night of Horror International Film Festival 2021 (Sydney) (for Johannes Grenzfurthner and Samantha Lienhard)
 Being Different Award at Terror Molins 2021 (Spain)
 Golden Stake Award at Shockfest 2021
 Best International Science Fiction and Fantasy Feature at Feratum Film Fest (Mexico)
Best Screenplay at South African Horrorfest 2021 (for Johannes Grenzfurthner and Samantha Lienhard)
Best Cinematography at South African Horrorfest 2021 (for Florian Hofer)
Best Editing at South African Horrorfest 2021 (for Johannes Grenzfurthner and Florian Hofer)
Best Feature Film at the British Horror Film Festival 2021
Best Trailer at Indie House 2022
Best Feature Film at Film Maudit 2.0 2022 (Los Angeles)
Best Editing of the Festival at Unnamed Footage Festival 2022 (San Francisco)

See also
 Art horror
 Horror-of-personality
 Social thriller
 Cosmicism

References

External links

Interview with Grenzfurthner in Film Threat
Interview with Grenzfurthner in Zebrabutter (German)
Interview with Grenzfurthner in PopHorror

2021 films
Austrian horror films
Austrian independent films
Psychological horror films
LGBT-related horror films
Medical-themed films
Splatter films
Found footage films
Films set in Florida
Films shot in Austria
Films set in 2019
Films about death
Films about diseases
Films about mental states
Films about science
Films about religion
Films about pseudoscience
Lovecraftian horror
Cosmic horror
Weird fiction
Fiction about diseases and disorders
Nerd culture
Hacker culture
DIY culture
Middle class culture
Monochrom
Internet culture
Films directed by Johannes Grenzfurthner
2020s English-language films